Abdallah Abu Sheikh is a Jordanian businessman and founder of Rizek and Barq EV.

Career
In 2019 he founded Rizek which is a service request application where user can request services across categories.

In 2021 Abdallah founded Barq EV, electric vehicles manufacturer in UAE.

Barq EV is the UAE's 1st drone delivery service provider which gained two Guinness World Records.

Abdallah was on cover page of Entrepreneur magazine Middle East in May 2022.

In 2022, Abdallah founded Astra Tech, a digital platform to integrating business-consumer, and Rizek was acquired by 'Astra Tech'. The company received $500 mn funding in 2022. The company also acquired Middle East internet calling platform BOTIM in January 2023.

Awards
2022 Most Influential Arabs
 Forbes Under 30 EL Gouna

References

External links
 Interview on Change Officer

Emirati businesspeople
Jordanian businesspeople
Living people
Year of birth missing (living people)